Ramsko lake is an artificial lake (reservoir), located in municipality of Prozor-Rama, in the vicinity of eponymous town, in Bosnia and Herzegovina. Lake is created with a construction of Rama dam in 1968, on the river Rama, and it serves as a reservoir to store Rama's waters used by Rama Hydroelectric Power Station.

See also
List of lakes in Bosnia and Herzegovina

References

http://herzegovina.travel/blog/listings/rama-lake/
Prozor-Rama
Lakes of Bosnia and Herzegovina